Mario Giordano (born 30 May 1963) is a German writer. His novel Black Box (1999), which is based on a true occurrence (Stanford prison experiment) was adapted to a film under the name Das Experiment directed by Oliver Hirschbiegel.
 The film was acclaimed and Giordano received for it among other prizes the Bavarian Film Award for Best Screenplay.

Books 
 Karakum
 Der aus den Docks
 Black Box (Das Experiment) also as screenplay
 Pangea (together with Andreas Schlüter)
 1000 Gefühle für die es keinen Namen gibt
Auntie Poldi and the Sicilian Lions
Auntie Poldi and the Fruits of the Lord
1,000 Feelings for Which There Are No Names - Ray Fenwick (Illustrator), Isabel Fargo Cole (Translator)

Screenplays 
 Das Experiment, from his novel Black Box, 2001
 Lilalu im Schepperland, from Enid Blyton, 2000

References

External links
 

1963 births
Living people
German male writers
German screenwriters
German male screenwriters
German television writers
Mass media people from Munich